David Soslanovich Kokoyev (born 29 August 2002) is a Russian football player who plays for FC Krasnodar and FC Krasnodar-2.

Club career
He made his debut in the Russian Football National League for FC Krasnodar-2 on 10 July 2021 in a game against FC Spartak-2 Moscow.

He made his Russian Premier League debut for FC Krasnodar on 4 May 2022 against FC Lokomotiv Moscow.

Career statistics

References

External links
 
 
 

2002 births
Sportspeople from Vladikavkaz
Living people
Russian footballers
Russia youth international footballers
Association football midfielders
FC Krasnodar players
FC Krasnodar-2 players
Russian Second League players
Russian First League players
Russian Premier League players